Kampen is a neighborhood (delområde) in the city of Stavanger which lies in the southwestern part of the large municipality of Stavanger in Rogaland county, Norway. It is located in the northern part of the borough of Eiganes og Våland surrounding the Kampen Church.

References

Boroughs and neighbourhoods of Stavanger